Bilateral relations between the countries of France and Trinidad and Tobago have existed for about two hundred years. Currently, France has an embassy in Port of Spain. Trinidad and Tobago is represented in France through its embassy in Brussels (Belgium).  Trinidad and Tobago also has bilateral investment agreements with France.

Colonial history
France colonized Tobago during the seventeenth century. France occupied the colony from August 1666 to March 1667.  On 6 December 1677, the French destroyed the Dutch colony and claimed the entire island, before restoring it to the Dutch by the first Treaty of Nijmegen on 10 August 1678.  In 1751, the French settled colonists on the island, but ceded it to Britain in the Treaty of Paris of 10 February 1763. Nevertheless, most "of the settlers were French, and French influence became dominant." It was again a French colony from 2 June 1781 to 15 April 1793, nominally part of the Lucie département of France from 25 October 1797 to 19 April 1801, and once again a French colony from 30 June 1802 to 30 June 1803.

Cultural legacy
By the later 1790s, the white upper class on Trinidad "consisted mainly of French creoles," which created "a powerful French cultural influence in Trinidad.  This was expressed not only in the widespread use of French Patois (French-lexicon Creole)...but also in the general population's enthusiasm for the Catholic tradition of Carnival." Sean Sheehan explains further that for "about a hundred years, the language spoken in Trinidad and Tobago was a pidgin form of French, which was basically French with Twi or Yoruba words included.  Even today, there is a strong element of French in Trini, and in some rural areas, people speak a language that is closer to French than to English."

See also 
 Foreign relations of France
 Foreign relations of Trinidad and Tobago

Notes and references

External links 
Embassy of France in Port of Spain
Agreement Between the Government of the Republic of Trinidad and Tobago and the Government of France on the Reciprocal Promotion and Protection of Investments

 
Trinidad and Tobago
Bilateral relations of Trinidad and Tobago